Causation may refer to:

Philosophy 
 Causality, a relationship that describes and analyses cause and effect

Physics 
 Causality (physics)

Law 
 Causation (law), a key component to establish liability in both criminal and civil law
 Proximate cause, the basis of liability in negligence in the United States
 Causation, in English law, defines the requirement for liability in negligence

Language 
 "Correlation does not imply causation", phrase used in the sciences and statistics

Sociology 
 Causation (sociology), the belief that events or actions can directly produce change in another variable in a predictable and observable manner

Other uses 
 Proximate causation, the direct reason behind an event occurring

See also 

 Causality (disambiguation)
 Cause (disambiguation)

fr:Causalité